Micro Cars is an automobile company based in Peliyagoda, Sri Lanka, founded in 1995. It was established by automobile engineer, Dr. Lawrence Perera.  Micro Cars is a fully owned subsidiary of Micro Holdings.

History
Micro Cars was established by TAK engineer, Dr. Lawrence Perara.  Micro's first introduction was "Micro Privilege" which had  gasoline engine with inline 4 cylinders. After that it produced Micro MPV Junior van and the Micro Trend hatchback, which were more advanced than the first introduction 
The "Micro" is designed, developed, and prototyped to be manufactured locally with at least 60% of local content. The prototype was prepared in 1999 with the running chassis making its debut run in December. The body was modeled in styling clay and then transferred to composite for final analysis in June 2000.

The first Micro was made in mid-2001. The Board of Investment provided state support for the car project. Its first car was legally registered only in 2003 after a lengthy battle with the motor car registration department of the country. Micro Cars export products to Nepal, Pakistan, and Bangladesh. Micro Cars, which is a fully owned subsidiary of Micro Holdings, is engaged in imports and assembly of the vehicle brands Geely, Ssangyong of India, Hafei and Great Wall Motors of China.

Products

Micro Panda/Panda Cross.

The Panda is assembled in Sri Lanka by Micro Cars from complete knock down kits. It is a small city car sold with a choice of  petrol engines. A 1.3 Cross version is also sold. Both come with 5 speed manual transmission and Micro Panda has a top speed of 150 km/h and Panda cross with 160 km/h. Micro Panda can generate 70 horsepower at 5500 rpm while Panda cross can generate 85 horsepower at 5500 rpm. The chinese model Geely LC has a Five star safety rating from C-NCAP.

Micro MX7 Mark II
The MX7 Mark II is a rebadged version of the Geely MK (also known as King Kong), it is a traditional saloon car powered by a  petrol engine producing 93 horsepower at 6000 rpm. The car comes with 5 speed manual transmission, had a top speed of 165 km/h can accelerate from 0 – 100 km/h in 18 seconds.

Micro EC7
The EC7 is a four-door saloon, powered by 1  petrol engine producing 139PS.

Micro Impreza
The Impreza is a fastback saloon powered by 2  petrol engine producing 148 hp.

Micro Chairman W
The Chairman W is a large four-door saloon.

Micro Actyon
This is the SUV manufactured in Sri Lanka by Micro Car Company. It has a   inter cooler Turbo Diesel Common Rail Direct Injection 3rd Generation VGT (Variable Geometry Turbo) A200XVT Engine producing a maximum power of Power  @ 4,000 rpm and a maximum Torque  @ 1,800 rpm. It also comprises a 6 Speed Automatic with Tip-Tronic transmission or 5 Speed Manual transmission together with a Part-time 4WD system with shift on the fly to 2WD.

Micro Rexton II

This is the SUV made by Micro Car Co Ltd. in collaboration with Ssanyong Motors, South Korea. In essence, a copy of the SsangYong Rexton with some degree of local content such as the interior. It is powered by an ex-Mercedes Benz  Diesel Engine with tip-tronic transmission.

Micro Rodius
This is another SUV made by Micro Car Co Ltd. in collaboration with Ssanyong Motors. In essence, a copy of the SsangYong Rodius also with some degree of local content such as the interior. It is powered by an ex-Mercedes Benz  6-cylinder gasoline engine (  &  ) and the  5-cylinder common rail diesel engine (  &  ).

Micro Duo Deck bus
The Micro Duo Deck is a double-decker bus designed and manufactured by Micro Cars Ltd following a deal with Chinese suppliers in 2006. The bus features a low floor arrangement, ABS brakes, full air-conditioning and automatic doors. The bus has seating for 102 persons and 26 standing. The engine and chassis are imported with Chinese parts and assembled in Sri Lanka.

Discontinued models
Micro Privilege
The Privilege was the first car produced by Micro.
This car is powered by  Inline 4-cylinder EFI gasoline engine. Transmission system is 5-speed manual. It includes other common options which can be found in other normal cars, such as crystal head lamps, factory fitted air conditioner, 13" wheel rim, radio CD/cassette player, electric windows, and remote central locking.

Micro Trend
The Micro Trend is a city car designed by Italy's Pininfarina and Hafei Motors. It was first introduced in January 2003 and sales began by April 2003. However, in 2010 they introduced a new version of the Micro Trend, with the first batch of New Trend cars on sale by early March 2011.

Micro MX7 Mark II

The Micro MX7 is a traditional saloon car designed by Pininfarina and powered by a Mitsubishi  petrol engine producing .

Micro MPV
Micro MPV is the Company's first mini van made at start of the company.

Collaboration
At present, Micro Car company is assembling SUVs in Sri Lanka, in collaboration with SsangYong Motors of South Korea. The vehicles include the SsangYong Kyron, SsangYong Actyon and Ssangyong Rexton, all powered by Mercedes-Benz engines.

References

External links
 http://www.microcars.lk - Official website

Vehicle manufacturing companies established in 1995
Motor vehicle manufacturers of Sri Lanka
Sri Lankan brands